Tropical Storm Wendy, known in the Philippines as Tropical Storm Mameng, was a deadly tropical cyclone that affected China in early September 1999. Wendy was first monitored on August 29, 1999, and was designated as a tropical depression by PAGASA the next day. Soon afterwards, the JTWC issued a Tropical Cyclone Formation Alert on the strengthening disturbance. On the first day of September, the JTWC designated the disturbance as Tropical Depression 20W. The storm reached its peak intensity late on September 2 and made landfall on China the next night dissipating not long afterward. Wendy caused 133 deaths and 309.3 million dollars (1999 USD) in damage. Despite this, the name Wendy was not retired.

Meteorological history

On August 29, 1999, the JTWC began to monitor an area of thunderstorm activity northeast of Yap. By the next day, a broad Lower-Level-Circulation-Center (LLC) had formed with the upper-level environment in the region favorable for additional strengthening. The system had two primary clusters of strong thunderstorm activity with the highest winds at the edge of the circulation center. The next morning, the JTWC issued a Tropical Cyclone Formation Alert on the developing disturbance because satellite imagery had suggested that a separate LLC was forming in one of the clusters of thunderstorm activity. Early on September 1, the JTWC upgraded the disturbance to a tropical depression designating it "20W".

Late on September 1, PAGASA upgraded Tropical Depression Mameng (20W) to a tropical storm. Early the next morning, the JTWC relocated the circulation center  to the north as the depression began to approach the island of Luzon. Soon after the storm began to move away from Luzon after its closest approach, the JTWC upgraded Tropical Depression 20W to a tropical storm and assigned it the name Wendy. At 0000 UTC on September 3, the JTWC, PAGASA, and the JMA, the official warning center for the region reported that Wendy (Mameng) had reached its peak intensity with PAGASA issuing its final advisory as it moved out of its area of responsibility. Twelve hours later, the JMA downgraded the tropical storm to a depression. Tropical Storm Wendy continued to move towards the Chinese coast for the next day. The tropical depression dissipated early on September 4 while over the mountains of China.

Impact and aftermath
Tropical Storm Wendy killed at least 133 people in Wenzhou, China, left 59 missing, and injured 2600 more. The storm was labeled "the most serious storm of the century" by the local government. 2.21 million people were effected and 277 million dollars (1999 USD) in direct economic losses due to the storm. The tropical storm flooded over 20,000 hectares of farmland, killed 38,000 livestock and caused 35 million dollars (1999 USD) of direct economic losses in agriculture, forestry, fishing and livestock husbandry. The storm also flooded 54 large companies, causing losses of 4.3 million dollars (1999 USD). Rains from the storm destroyed 2000 houses and damaged 8326 more, and disrupting electric power, communication and traffic in some areas of the region.

See also
1999 Pacific typhoon season
List of historic tropical cyclone names

References

External links

JMA General Information of Tropical Storm Wendy (9914) from Digital Typhoon
JMA Best Track Data (Graphics) of Tropical Storm Wendy (9914)
JMA Best Track Data (Text)
JTWC Best Track Data of Tropical Storm 20W (Wendy)
20W.WENDY from the U.S. Naval Research Laboratory

1999 Pacific typhoon season
Western Pacific tropical storms
Typhoons in China
1999 disasters in China
1999 disasters in the Philippines
Typhoons in the Philippines